André Reybaz (born 29 October 1929 in Paris, France, died 7 April 1989 in Le Pré-Saint-Gervais, France) was a French actor.

Reybaz had a long career spanning 40 years, which mostly consisted of numerous French television appearances. In 1950 he starred in the writer Jean Genet's only film, the influential Un chant d'amour (aka A Song Of Love), which focused on the longing desires of the a prison guard and prisoners of a French jail.

Filmography

References

Selected filmography 
 Il n'y a pas de fumée sans feu (1972)

1929 births
1989 deaths
French male television actors
Troupe of the Comédie-Française
20th-century French male actors